Significant events in radio broadcasting in the year 1969 included the debuts of two documentaries on rock and roll.

Events
21–23 February: The History of Rock and Roll, a comprehensive 48-part documentary, debuts on KHJ in Los Angeles. Produced and hosted by Bill Drake, the series airs on the RKO General chain of stations that Drake programmed, and is nationally syndicated.
1 March: NHK begins FM broadcasting in Japan.
9 March: With the exception of Arthur Godfrey Time, WTOP in Washington, DC switches to an all-news format.
11 April: Radyo Veritas, the first Catholic radio station in the Philippines, was inaugurated with Asian bishops as guests. Antonio Cardinal Samore represented Pope Paul VI. It began broadcasting on the frequency of 860 kHz, formerly assigned to DZST, another Catholic radio station formerly operated by the University of Santo Tomas.
15 June: DZME 1530 started its broadcast when the Congress authorized Capitol Broadcasting Center of Jose M. Luison and Sons, Inc. to operate an AM radio station in the Philippines. 
3 October: The Fernsehturm Berlin, a broadcasting tower, opens in East Berlin.
November: The National Science Network, Inc. purchased KMPX (FM) in San Francisco, and KPPC (AM) and KPPC-FM in Pasadena from Crosby-Pacific Broadcasting Company for a combined $1,084,000.
Undated
 WSAU-FM in Wausau, Wisconsin changes to Top 40 as WIFC, and continues with those calls and format nearly 40 years later.

Debuts
 9 February, The Pop Chronicles on KRLA 1110.
 21 February, The History of Rock and Roll on KHJ.
WCCO-FM in Minneapolis, Minnesota signs on.

Births
31 January – Craig Carton, American radio personality, co-host of Boomer Esiason's morning show on WFAN in New York City, which became the permanent replacement for Imus in the Morning on 4 September 2007.
7 June – Adam Buxton, English actor and comedian

Deaths
3 January: Howard McNear, American stage, screen and radio character actor.

References 

 
Radio by year